William Esson, FRS (17 May 1838 – 28 August 1916) was a British mathematician.

Early life
He was born in Carnoustie, Scotland.

Esson attended St John's College, Oxford.

Career
He then became a Fellow of Merton College. In 1892, he became the Savilian Professor of Geometry at the University of Oxford, based at New College. He worked on problems in chemistry with Augustus George Vernon Harcourt.

In 1869 he was elected a Fellow of the Royal Society and in 1895 delivered, jointly with Harcourt, their Bakerian Lecture on the Laws of Connexion between the Conditions of a Chemical Change and its Amount. III. Further Researches on the Reaction of Hydrogen Dioxide and Hydrogen Iodide.

He was on the governing body of Abingdon School until 1900.

Personal life
In 1874, Esson leased 13 Bradmore Road in North Oxford. He died in Abingdon, England.

References

1838 births
1916 deaths
Alumni of St John's College, Oxford
Scottish mathematicians
Fellows of Merton College, Oxford
Fellows of New College, Oxford
Savilian Professors of Geometry
19th-century British mathematicians
20th-century British mathematicians
Fellows of the Royal Society
Governors of Abingdon School